General Henry William Breton (7 January 1799 – 22 July 1889) was a British Army officer who became General Officer Commanding South-West District. His twin brother was William Henry Breton.

Military career
Breton was commissioned as an ensign in the 4th Regiment of Foot in March 1815. He became commanding officer of the 53rd Regiment of Foot in 1848 and a brigade commander in India in April 1850. Promoted to major-general in 1851, he became General Officer Commanding South-West District in February 1855 and commander of the troops in Mauritius in 1857.

He also served as the twelfth and final colonel of the 56th (West Essex) Regiment of Foot from 23 April 1860 to 1881, when the regiment amalgamated with the 44th Foot to form the Essex Regiment. He continued afterwards as the Colonel of the 2nd Battalion of the Essex regiment.

He was promoted Lieutenant-General 15 December 1861.

He was buried at Highland Road Cemetery in Portsmouth.

References

British Army generals
1799 births
1889 deaths
56th Regiment of Foot officers
King's Own Royal Regiment officers
Place of birth missing
Place of death missing
Essex Regiment officers
19th-century British Army personnel
Burials in Hampshire